Baba Zahed (also Romanized as Bābā Zāhed; also known as Bāba Zaid, Bābā Zāyed, Baba Zeidchaloo, Bābā Zeyār, and Bābā Zeyd) is a village in Chelo Rural District, Chelo District, Andika County, Khuzestan Province, Iran. At the 2006 census, its population was 154, in 24 families.

References 

Populated places in Andika County